Changing Husbands is a 1924 American silent comedy film starring Leatrice Joy and Victor Varconi, directed by Paul Iribe and Frank Urson, and written by Sada Cowan and Howard Higgin. The runtime of the film is 70 minutes.

Cast

Preservation
A print of Changing Husbands is preserved in the Library of Congress collection.

References

External links

Stills and lobby card at silentfilmstillarchive.com

American black-and-white films
1924 films
American silent feature films
1924 comedy films
Paramount Pictures films
Silent American comedy films
Surviving American silent films
Films directed by Frank Urson
Films directed by Paul Iribe
1920s American films